There are number of spa towns in the Czech Republic. Between the oldest and most visited are the spas of Karlovy Vary, Mariánské Lázně, Františkovy Lázně, Luhačovice and Poděbrady. In 2011 the Czech spas were visited by around 700,000 guests, of whom around half were foreigners, mainly from Germany, Russia and Austria.

List of spa towns:

 Bílina
 Lázně Bludov
 Darkov
 Františkovy Lázně
 Hodonín
 Jáchymov
 Jeseník
 Karlova Studánka
 Karlovy Vary
 Klimkovice
 Lázně Bělohrad
 Lázně Bohdaneč
 Lipová-lázně
 Luhačovice
 Mariánské Lázně
 Poděbrady
 Teplice
 Teplice nad Bečvou
 Třeboň
 Velké Losiny

References

 
Czech
Spa
Populated places in the Czech Republic
Tourism in the Czech Republic